Alexei Nikolayevich Seliverstov (sometimes listed as Aleksey Seliverstov, born July 24, 1976 in Ufa) is a Russian bobsledder who has competed since 1996. Competing in three Winter Olympics, he won the silver medal in the four-man event with teammates Philippe Egorov, Alexandre Zoubkov, and Alexey Voevoda at Turin in 2006.

Seliverstov also won two medals in the four-man event at the FIBT World Championships with a silver in 2005 and a bronze in 2003.

He participated in the torch relay for 2013 Summer Universiade in Kazan and the 2014 Winter Olympics in Sochi. He carried both torches through his hometown of Ufa, and lit the city cauldron outside the Ufa Arena with the Olympic torch.

References
 Bobsleigh four-man Olympic medalists for 1924, 1932-56, and since 1964
 Bobsleigh four-man world championship medalists since 1930
 FIBT profile (As Alexej Seliverstov)

1976 births
Bobsledders at the 1998 Winter Olympics
Bobsledders at the 2002 Winter Olympics
Bobsledders at the 2006 Winter Olympics
Living people
Olympic bobsledders of Russia
Olympic silver medalists for Russia
Russian male bobsledders
Sportspeople from Ufa
Olympic medalists in bobsleigh
Medalists at the 2006 Winter Olympics